Fredy Torres (Fredy Fernando Torres Portillo, born 10 May 1962, date of death February, 21, 1993) was a Salvadoran judoka. He competed at the 1984 Summer Olympics and the 1988 Summer Olympics.

On February 21, 1993, Judoka Fredy Fernando Torres Portillo, 30 years old, was assassinated in Parque Libertad in San Salvador: he had been threatened by the Death Squads.

References

1962 births
Living people
Salvadoran male judoka
Olympic judoka of El Salvador
Judoka at the 1984 Summer Olympics
Judoka at the 1988 Summer Olympics
Place of birth missing (living people)